The Yangbajing Solar Park is a 30 MWp photovoltaic power station located in Yangbajain, Tibet.

See also

List of photovoltaic power stations
Photovoltaic power station
Photovoltaics

References

Photovoltaic power stations in China
Buildings and structures in Tibet